The USA Cross Country Championships is the annual national championships for cross country running in the United States. The championships is generally held in mid-February and it serves as a way of designating the country's national champion, as well as acting as the selection race for the IAAF World Cross Country Championships.

The competition, currently run under the auspices of USA Track & Field, traces its history back to 1883. The competition was held sporadically until 1905 at which point it has been held every year since.  The National Championship has been sponsored by multiple organizations over the years, some of them holding competing championships.  It has thus been known under a variety of names.

Women did not have a championship until 1964.  Until 1979, women's championships were segregated from the men, on the same date in a different location.

Currently there are two major Cross Country Championship events, generally referred to as the "Fall Championships" and the "Winter Championships."  The Fall Championships generally happen in late November or early December, which corresponds with the end of the broader cross country season from late-August into November.  Since 1998, those have been known as the USATF National Club Cross Country Championships.  The Winter Championships generally happen in late January or early February and since they are three months after the broader season, are geared towards selecting the international team for the World Championships which is generally held in late March.  Since 2011, the World Championships are only held in odd numbered years but USA continues to hold Winter Championships every year.

There are currently several races held at the Fall Championships, the number of races depends on the number of entries.  In addition to the open races for each gender, there are masters championships in each age division.  Open and masters men run 10K up to age 60.  60 and above run 8K races.  All women's divisions run 6K, but masters run at least one separate race.  When there are a large number of entries, even the one division can be broken into an A section and a B section to make the number of runners on the course manageable.

There are currently four races held at each Winter Championships: the men's 12 km open race, the women's 8 km open race, a junior men's race of 8 km and a junior women's race of 6 km. All four serve as selection races for the IAAF World Championships in which the top six runners from each race gain qualification.  Each race awards medals on an individual basis and a team basis (where the performances by athletes belonging to a certain running club or sponsor are combined). Between 1998 and 2006 the championships featured short course races of 4 km for both men and women – these races are now discontinued. Occasionally, masters races, determined by age group, are held as part of the championships.

Lynn Jennings won the championship nine times between 1985 and 1996, when there was only the one championship for women. She is the only competitor to have won the USA Cross Country Championships and IAAF World Championships in the same year, having done so three times consecutively in 1990, 1991 and 1992.  Prior to the existence of the World Championships, Doris Brown pulled the same feat four times, three consecutively with the "International Championships" in 1967, 1969, 1970 and 1971.  While Brown also won the 1968 International Championship, part of five in a row, she lost the November 1967 US Championship to Vicki Foltz.  Pat Porter won eleven of the various men's championships over a seven-year period of time between 1982 and 1989, including eight Fall Championships in a row.  In the 1930s, Don Lash won seven in a row (1934-1940).

One set of brothers;  Bill Ashenfelter and Horace Ashenfelter have won championships.  Two sets of spouses have won championships;  Cathy Branta (Easker) (1984) and John Easker (1986);  Shayne Culpepper and Alan Culpepper.  The Culpeppers did it on the same day, February 16, 2003.

The competition has been televised in the past on ESPN2.

History
The first events claiming the National Championship moniker were the "Amateur Individual Cross Country Championship of America" hosted by the New York Athletic Club (NYAC) in Mott Haven, Bronx starting in 1883.  In 1887, the National Cross Country Association (NCCA) began holding championships.  Both organizations held championships in 1887.  Coincidentally, both were won by Edward C. Carter.  NCCA held their last championship in 1892 at the Morris Park Racecourse.  NYAC revived the series in 1897 also at Morris Park.  The Knickerbocker Athletic Club hosted in the same location in April 1898 but in November of the same year, the Amateur Athletic Union (AAU) held their first such event "The Cross-Country Individual and Team Championship of the A.A.U."  AAU's second championship wasn't until 1903 but in between, the 1901 Pan-American Exposition in Buffalo, New York hosted a race regarded as a national championship.  AAU's third race was in 1905, called the “National Cross Country Championship of the A.A.U.” and the championship has been held continuously since, under that name until the demise of the AAU as the national governing body in 1979.  The championship for some seasons has fallen on opposite sides of the new year occasionally.  The first race in Van Cortlandt Park was held in 1912, that venue has been a frequent host of the championship ever since, 25 times,  even as recently as 2006.  The first championship not held in the state of New York was 1917, when it was held in Franklin Park in Boston.  To date, a championship has been held in 31 different states.

In 1962, the U.S. Track & Field Federation (USTFF) began holding a competing “National Cross Country Championship of the U.S.T.F.F.” in the same week as the AAU.  Most were in different venues, but the two 1964 championships were both held in Washington Park, Chicago two days apart.  The same situation happened in 1968 at Van Cortlandt Park.  In 1969, Jack Bacheler won both championships, USTFF at Penn State on November 26 and AAU at Bloomfield Hills, Michigan on November 29.  The following year, his teammate Frank Shorter accomplished the same feat.  Craig Virgin technically duplicated it in 1977, after winning USTFF, he finished second to British athlete Nick Rose at the AAU.  By being the first American citizen to cross the finish line, Virgin was the AAU National Champion that year.  Starting in 1975, the AAU added the “World Cross Country Championship Senior Men's Trials” in February at a more appropriate time to select an international team to the  IAAF World Cross Country Championships.  In 1979 the USTFF renamed itself Track and Field Association, USA using the acronym USTFA for two years.  There is no evidence USTFF or USTFA ever held a championship for women.

As the new national governing body, The Athletics Congress (TAC) began administering the “National Cross Country Championship of T.A.C.” a month later.  TAC changed its name to USATF in 1993, first holding "The U.S.A.T.F. National Cross Country Championship."

A Women's national championship was added in 1964.  The women's championship was held at a separate location on the same date until 1979.  In the last season of the AAU administration it was finally combined to the same location and date as the men.

In 1998, the IAAF World Cross Country Championships began long course and short course championships, USATF commensurately held long and short course championships as qualifiers.  1998 was the first year women joined the men in holding a separate qualifier, at the same unified location.  Prior to that, the women qualified to the World Championships based on their Championship about three months earlier.  That same year, the Fall Championships were renamed the USATF National Club Cross Country Championships, with the USATF website redirecting the lineage of National Championship history to the February event..

While the championship has predominantly been held in the last two weeks of November, aligning with the close of the traditional fall season on the scholastic level, it has occurred in eight different months around the year.  In 1998, 1999, 2001 and 2003, the Fall Championship locations and dates were chosen to correspond with the location of the USATF Annual Meeting.

International qualifier
While the International Cross Country Championships existed back to 1898 for men and 1931 for women, the United States did not send representatives to participate until 1966 (when Tracy Smith brought home a bronze medal) for men and 1967 for women (after the women's event had not been held for 10 years).  Those representatives were selected from the National Championship race.  Doris Brown won the 1967 Championship and the next four championships after that.  By 1970, USA hosted the 1970 International Cross Country Championships for women in Frederick, Maryland but the event was segregated from the men's championship in Vichy, France the following day, though there was a women's race also held in Vichy resulting in two champions that year, one of them Brown.

In 1973, the International Championships gave way to the new IAAF World Cross Country Championships.  In 1973, US men did not participate but US women won the team bronze medal.  US men again did not participate in the 1974 World Championships, though the US Junior Men did participate and won the team gold medal behind Rich Kimball's individual win over future Olympic medalist John Treacy.  US men decided to take the World Championships seriously in 1975, holding a separate qualifying event in February.  US women did not hold a separate qualifying race, then combined with the men, until 1998.

Editions

Men only race

Key

Split gender divisions

Combined gender divisions

USATF era
Key

See also
USATF National Club Cross Country Championships
USA Outdoor Track and Field Championships
USA Indoor Track and Field Championships
Foot Locker Cross Country Championships
NCAA Men's Cross Country Championship
NCAA Women's Cross Country Championship

References

External links
 Official website
 USA Cross Country Champions – Men
 USA Cross Country Champions – Women at USA Track & Field''
 Media Guide

 
Cross country running in the United States
Recurring sporting events established in 1890
Cross
National cross country running competitions
Cross